This is a list of Nepalese Twenty20 cricketers. Twenty20 cricket matches are those between international teams or the highest standard of domestic teams. Matches played in the ICC World Twenty20 Qualifier also qualify as Twenty20. This list is not limited to those who have played Twenty20 cricket for Nepal and may include Nepalese players who played their Twenty20 cricket elsewhere. The players are listed alphabetically by their last name.

Key

Players 

Statistics are correct as of Nepal's most recent Twenty20 match, against Jersey on 18 July 2015.

See also 
 Nepal national cricket team
 Twenty20
 List of Nepal Twenty20 International cricketers
 List of Nepalese First-class cricketers
 List of Nepalese List A cricketers

External links 

 Cricket Archive
 Nepalese players in the 2012 ICC World Twenty20 Qualifier
 Nepalese players in the 2013 ICC World Twenty20 Qualifier
 Nepalese players in the 2014 ICC World Twenty20
 Nepalese players in the 2014 Sri Lanka Tour
 Nepalese players in the 2015 Netherlands Tour
 Nepalese players in the 2015 ICC World Twenty20 Qualifier

References 

Twenty20